The Rocketeer is a 1991 video game developed by Ironwind Software and published by Bandai for the Nintendo Entertainment System. It is based on the film of the same name.

Gameplay
The game is a two-dimensional side-scroller that was common to the NES platform during the era in which it was released.

References

External links

Fiction set in 1938
1991 video games
Bandai games
Nintendo Entertainment System games
Nintendo Entertainment System-only games
North America-exclusive video games
Platform games
Video games based on films
Video games based on adaptations
Video games set in 1938
Video games scored by George Sanger
Video games developed in the United States